Aumer is a surname of:

 Hermann Aumer (April 30, 1915 – May 30, 1955), German politician (BP)
 Jean-Louis Aumer, French danseur and choreographer
 Katherine Aumer (formerly Katherine Aumer-Ryan, born 1981), American social psychologist
 Peter Aumer (born 17 April 1976), German politician (CDU)